The Andean motmot or highland motmot (Momotus aequatorialis) is a colorful near-passerine bird found from northern Colombia to western Bolivia.

Taxonomy and systematics

The Andean motmot and the blue-capped (Momotus coeruleiceps), whooping (M. subrufrescens), Trinidad (M. bahamensis), Lesson's (M. lessonii), and Amazonian motmots (M. momota) were all at one time considered conspecific. The Andean motmot has two recognized subspecies, the nominate Momotus aequatorialis aequatorialis and M. a. chlorolaemus.

Appearance 

The Andean motmot is in general typical of its family: It is a large bird with a stout black bill and a long tail with a "racquet" tip. Its back, wings, throat, breast, and belly are green. The crown is black, bordered on the sides and rear with a "diadem" of various shades of blue. It has a black "mask" bordered with blue and a black spot or streak in the center of the breast. The racquets are dark blue.

Distribution and habitat
The Andean motmot is resident in the Andes from Colombia through Ecuador and Peru to La Paz Department in northwestern Bolivia. In Colombia, it occurs in all three major cordilleras, but in Ecuador, Peru, and Bolivia it is found only along the eastern side of the Andes.

The Andean motmot primarily inhabits humid montane forest, often near steams. It can also be found along forest edges and in secondary forest.

Behavior

Feeding

The Andean motmot is omnivorous. It primarily feeds on arthropods but also eats fruit. It has been documented taking a small marsupial of genus Micoureus.

Breeding

The Andean motmot is assumed to nest in a long burrow in an earth bank like other motmots, but the nest has not been described. A male in breeding condition was collected in September in Colombia.

Vocalization

The song of the Andean motmot has been described as "a monotone boop-oop" , similar to that of rufous motmot.

Status

The IUCN has assessed the Andean motmot as being of Least Concern.

Gallery

References

Additional reading

Andean motmot
Birds of the Andes
Birds of the Northern Andes
Andean motmot
Taxa named by John Gould